Clifford Dean Schimmels (May 11, 1937 – May 9, 2001) was an American football coach and Baptist speaker and educator.  He served as chaplain to the Chicago Cubs and Chicago White Sox while also a professor at Wheaton College and Lee University.

Personal life
Schimmels was born in 1937 in Arapaho, Oklahoma.  He attended Oklahoma Baptist University in Shawnee, Oklahoma. He later earned a Master's Degree from Southwestern Oklahoma State University in Weatherford, Oklahoma. He earned his PhD at the University of Oklahoma in 1973.

While a student at Oklahoma Baptist, Schimmels met and married fellow student, Mary Wade. They had three children: Paula, Larry, and Kristina. Schimmels also had four grandchildren: Alyssa, Ann, Delaney, and Will.

Coaching career
Schimmels was the head football coach for the Wheaton College in Wheaton, Illinois.  He held that position for the 1980 season.  His coaching record at Wheaton was 2–7.

References

1937 births
2001 deaths
Oklahoma Baptist University alumni
Southwestern Oklahoma State University alumni
University of Oklahoma alumni
Wheaton College (Illinois) faculty
Wheaton Thunder football coaches
People from Custer County, Oklahoma